The letter V with hook (Upper case Ʋ, minuscule: ʋ) is a letter of the Latin alphabet, based on an italic form of V, although it more closely resembles U. It is used in the orthographies of some African languages such as Ewe, and Shona from 1931 to 1955 to write . In Mossi (Mooré) it is used to write . In Kabiye and Ikposso it is used to write  (with retracted tongue root).

Its lowercase form, is used in the International Phonetic Alphabet for a labiodental approximant.

Its Unicode code points are U+01B2 and U+028B, respectively.

See also
Ƒ ƒ

External links
 http://sumale.vjf.cnrs.fr/phono/Reclangues1N.php?ChoixCellule=C136NL

Latin-script letters
Phonetic transcription symbols